Hidekazu Takayama (born 20 March 1948) is a Brazilian politician and pastor from Rolândia, having served as city councilor and state representative.

Early life
Takayama was born to Antonio Izami Takayama and Maria Schizuka, and is a third-generation Japanese Brazilian. He is a pastor of the Assembleias de Deus church.

Political career
In 2015 Takayama had to be hospitalized with an edema in his right eye and a cut in his mouth after he was punched by the driver of Delcídio Amaral at the entrance of parliament. According to reports, Amaral's vehicle was blocking the entrance, to which Takayama and his companions confronted his driver, who after being manhandled responded by forcefully punching Takayama.

Takayama voted in favor of the impeachment against then-president Dilma Rousseff. However, Takayama would latter back Rousseff's successor Michel Temer against a similar motion.

In April 2017 Takayama replaced João Campos as leader of the union of evangelical politicians in the Brazilian legislature, which campaigns for the conservative evangelical stances on issues, most notably opposition to same-sex marriage and unions.

References

1948 births
Living people
People from Rolândia
Social Christian Party (Brazil) politicians
Party of the Nation's Retirees politicians
Brazilian Assemblies of God pastors
Brazilian politicians of Japanese descent
Members of the Chamber of Deputies (Brazil) from Paraná
Members of the Legislative Assembly of Paraná